Franklin Building may refer to:

Franklin Building (Chicago) a Printer's Row building designed by George C. Nimmons with mural and painted tile artworks by Oskar Gross
Franklin Building in Brooklyn, New York designed by the Parfitt Brothers
Franklin Exchange Building in Tampa, Florida
Franklin College Building No. 5 in New Athens, Ohio